The twenty-two volumes of the Historiæ Patriæ Monumenta series (often identified with the abbreviation HPM) contain Italian historical documents and were published between 1836 and 1901 in two series.

The volumes, which were initially devoted solely to the history of the Kingdom of Sardinia, were produced by the Royal Mission for the Study of the History of the Fatherland [Italian: Regia Deputazione sopra gli studi di Storia Patria], founded in 1833 in Turin by King Charles Albert of Sardinia.

An alternative title, Monumenta Historiæ Patriæ was used on the title page and in the half-title of volumes II to V and only in the half-title from volume X onwards.

The 20th volume (Leges Municipales, IV) was not published until 1955.

Volumes

First Series 

 Volume. Chartarum, I, Turin, 1836.
 Chartae ab anno DCII ad annum MCCLXXXXII

 Volume II. Leges Municipales, I, Turin, 1838.
 Statuta ac privilegia civitatis Secusiae (Susa)
 Statuta et privilegia civitatis Augustae Praetoriae (Aosta)
 Statuta et privilegia civitatis Niciae (Nice)
 Statuta consulatus ianuensis (Genoa)
 Statuta et privilegia civitatis Taurinensis (Turin)
 Statuta Societatis beati Georgii populi Chieriensis (Chieri)
 Statuta communis Casalis (Casale Monferrato)
 Statuta civitatis Eporediae (Ivrea)
 Statuta civitatis Montiscalerii (Moncalieri)
 Volume III. Scriptorum, I, Turin, 1840.
 Anciennes chroniques de Savoye
 Perrinet Dupin, Chronique du conte Rouge
 Chronica latina Sabaudiae
 Chronica abbatiae Altaecumbae
 Chronica ab anno 1475 usque ad annum 1515
 Domenicus Machaneus, Epitomae historicae
 Pierre Lambert de la Croix, Memoires sur la vie de Charles duc de Savoye neuvième
 Giuseppe Cambiano, Historico discorso al serenissimo Filippo Emanuele di Savoia
 Volume IV. Scriptorum, II, Turin, 1839.
 Pietro Gioffredo, Storia delle Alpi Marittime, libri XXVI.
 Volume V. Scriptorum, III, Turin, 1848.
 Fragmenta chronicae antiquae civitatis Pedonae
 Vita beati Dalmatii
 Chronicon novaliciense
 Waltharius
 Beati Heldradi novaliciensis abbatis vita
 Necrologium prioratus sancti Andreae taurinensis
 Necrologium monasterii sanctorum Solutoris, Adventoris et Octavii taurinensis
 Sancti Iohannis confessoris archiepiscopi ravennatis ecclesiae vita
 Libellus narrationis seu chronicon coenobii sancti Michaelis de Clusa
 Willelmus, Venerabilis Benedicti clusensis abbatis vita
 Summariae constitutiones monasterii beatae Mariae de Abundantia
 Necrologium monasterii beatae Mariae de Abundantia
 Fragmentum martyrologii ecclesiae beati Evasii casalensis
 Necrologium insignis collegii canonicorum sanctorum Petri et Ursi Augustae Praetoriae
 Selecta e libro anniverssariorum, refectoriorum, vigiliarum et missarum conventualium ecclesiae cathedralis augustanae
 Martyrologium graeco-augustanum ecclesiae sancti Mauricii de Brusson
 Kalendarium augustanum
 Extractus anniversariorum, refectoriorum, vigiliarum et missarum conventualium fieri solitarum in ecclesiae cathedrali civitatis Augustae Praetoriae
 Ogerio Alfieri, Fragmenta de gestium astesium
 Memoriale Guilielmi Venturae civis astensis
 Memoriale Secundini Venturae civis astensis
 Gioffredo della Chiesa, Cronaca di Saluzzo
 Galeotto del Carretto, Cronica di Monferrato
 Benvenuti Sangeorgii chronicon
 Iacopo da Acqui, Chronicon imaginis mundi
 Volume VI. Chartarum, II, Turin, 1853.
 Chartae ab anno DCC ad annum MCCLXXXXIX
 Ursonis notarii ianuensis Carmen, saec. XIII.
 Volume VII. Liber Iurium Reipublicae Genuensis, I, Turin, 1854.
 Volume VIII. Edicta Regum Langobardorum, I, Turin, 1855.
 Volume IX. Liber Iurium Reipublicae Genuensis, II, Turin, 1857.
 Volume X. Codex diplomaticus Sardiniae, I, Turin, 1861.
 Volume XI. Scriptores, IV, Turin, 1863.
 Guglielmino Schiavina, Annales alexandrini
 Anastasio Germonio, Commentariorum libri
 Giuseppe Francesco Meyranesio, Pedemontium sacrum
 Volume XII. Codex diplomaticus Sardiniae, II, Turin, 1868.
 Volume XIII. Chartarum, III, Torino, 1873.
 Codex diplomaticus Langobardie
 Volume XIV. Comitiorum, I, Pars prior, Turin, 1879.
 Statutes and documents from the  representative assembly of the Kingdom of Savoy, I, 1264-1560, edited by Frederigo Emanuele Bollati.

 Volume XV. Comitiorum, I, Pars altera, Turin, 1884.
 Atti e documenti delle antiche assemblee rappresentative nella Monarchia di Savoia, II, anni 1561-1766, edited by F. E. Bollati di Saint Pierre.
 Volume XVI Part I. Leges Municipales, II, pars prior, Turin, 1876.
 Liber statutorum consulum cumanorum iusticie et negociatorum (Como), edited by Antonio Ceruti
 Liber statutorum comunis Novocomi (Como), edited by Antonio Ceruti
 Statuta communitatis Novariae (Novara), a cura di Antonio Ceruti
 Liber consuetudinum Mediolani anno MCCXVI collectarum (Milan), edited by Giulio Porro Lambertenghi
 Statuta iurisdictionum Mediolani (Milan), edited by Antonio Ceruti
 Volume XVI Part II. Leges Municipales, II, pars altera, Turin, 1876.
 Statuta communis Vercellarum (Vercelli), edited by Giovanni Battista Adriani
 Statuti bresciani del secolo XIII (Brescia), edited by Federico Odorici
 Antiquae collationes statuti veteris civitatis Pergami (Bergamo)
 Volume XVII.  (Villa di Chiesa).
 Volume XVIII. Leges Municipales, Turin, 1901.
 Leges genuenses (Genoa)
 Volume XIX. Liber potheris communis civitatis Brixie (Brescia), edited by Federico Odorici, Turin, 1899.
 Volume XX. Leges Municipales, IV, Turin, 1955.
 Statues of Pinerolo and the Statutes of Chieri.

Second Series 
 Volume XXI. Codex diplomaticus Cremonae, I, Torino, 1895.
 Lorenzo Astegiano, Codice diplomatico cremonese, 715-1334, I.
 Volume XXII. Codex diplomaticus Cremonae, II, Torino, 1898.
 Lorenzo Astegiano, Codice diplomatico cremonese, 715-1334, II.

References

Other projects 

  Wikimedia Commons holds images or other files on Historiae Patriae Monumenta

History of Italy
Latin texts